René Moulaert (1901–1965) was a Belgian art director who worked on designing stage and film sets.

Selected filmography
 The Marriage of Mademoiselle Beulemans (1932)
 Strange Inheritance (1943)
 Night Shift (1944)
 Girl with Grey Eyes (1945)
 Patrie (1946)
 Sybille's Night (1947)
 Counter Investigation (1947)
 The Lovers Of Verona (1949)
 Thirst of Men (1950)
 Julie de Carneilhan (1950)
 The Night Is My Kingdom (1951)
 My Seal and Them (1951)
 My Friend Oscar (1951)
 Great Man (1951)
 Wolves Hunt at Night (1952)
 Stain in the Snow (1954)
 It Happened in Aden (1956)
 Sergeant X (1960)
 Women Are Like That (1960)
 Your Turn, Darling (1963)
 Shadow of Evil (1964)
 Marvelous Angelique (1965)

References

Bibliography
 Marianne Thys. Belgian Cinema. Cinematheque Royale du Belgique, 1999.

External links

1901 births
1965 deaths
Belgian art directors
Mass media people from Brussels